Karl August von Bergen (11 August 1704 in Frankfurt (Oder) – 7 October 1759 in ibid.) was a German anatomist and botanist.

Life 

Karl August von Bergen was the son of anatomy professor Johann Georg von Bergen (died 1738).

He attended the Gymnasium in his home town of Frankfurt an der Oder, he later  studied medicine at the local Viadrina University from 1727. There he was taught by his father and by the anatomist Andreas Ottomar Goelicke (1670–1744).

He  continued his studies at the University of Leiden, where he worked for the professors Herman Boerhaave (1668–1738), Bernhard Siegfried Albinus.

He also  studied in Paris and Strasbourg. He returned to Viadrina University and received his doctorate in medicine in 1732 and took a post as  a professor at the university.

After the death of his father, he was awarded the chair of anatomy and botany at the university. His duties included the care of the Botanical Garden, which had been founded in 1678 by Johann Christoph Bekmann.

In 1732 he demonstrated the general distribution of cellular membranes in animals, and showed that they  not only enclose every part of the animal frame, but form the basis of every organ. His work  was adopted and still more fully expanded (1757) by his friend Albrecht von Haller.

On 2 April 1739 he married Susanna Elizabeth Rhode. They had four children. After Susanna's early death he remarried on 29 September 1749 her sister, Mary Elizabeth Rhode.

His most noted work is Flora Francofurtana, Frankfurt (Oder), published in 1750. Among his more unusual works is an essay on the rhinoceros: Oratio de rhinocerote, quam habuit cum tertium deponeret rectoratum, Frankfurt (Oder), 1746.

The botanist Conrad Moench named the plant genus Bergenia in his honor in 1794.

Bibliography
 Letters 1743 to 1752, The Linnaeus Society.
Oratio de rhinocerote, quam habuit cum tertium deponeret rectoratum, Frankfurt (Oder), 1746
Flora Francofurtana, Frankfurt (Oder), published in 1750
Dissertatio Botanica De Aloide, published  1753 
Classes conchyliorum,  Published 1760

References

Dictionnaire des sciences médicales. Biographie médicale.Vol second Paris, 1820.
 Klaus Eichler:History of the Medical Faculty. Annual Report No. 1 of the Society for the Study of the History of the Association Viadrina Frankfurt (Oder), 1998.

1704 births
1759 deaths
18th-century German botanists
18th-century German scientists
18th-century Latin-language writers
18th-century German male writers
German anatomists
People from Frankfurt (Oder)
European University Viadrina alumni
18th-century German writers